List of administrative division codes of the PRC in Division 6 or Northwest China .

Shaanxi (61)

Gansu (62)

Qinghai (63)

Ningxia (64)

Xinjiang (65)

China geography-related lists